Jérôme Sonnerat (born 19 February 1985) is a French professional footballer who plays for Gallia Lucciana.

External links
 
 

1985 births
Living people
French footballers
French expatriate footballers
Expatriate footballers in Switzerland
Association football defenders
Servette FC players
Angers SCO players
FC La Chaux-de-Fonds players
FC Lausanne-Sport players
CA Bastia players
FC Bastia-Borgo players
Ligue 2 players
Swiss Super League players
Swiss Challenge League players
Championnat National players
Championnat National 2 players
Championnat National 3 players